Davidson Renato da Cruz Coronel (born 14 April 1986), known as Bijou, is a Cape Verdean former footballer who played as a central midfielder. He spent his entire professional career in Portugal.

Club career
Bijou was born in Praia. After being spotted at local Sporting Clube da Praia by scouts from S.L. Benfica he moved to Portugal, playing his first year as a senior with the reserve side in the third division.

Benfica B folded after that season and Bijou was loaned, alongside teammate Nicolás Canales, to Gondomar S.C. of the second level, where he only played one league game. Released by his parent club in the summer of 2007, he met the same fate at his next team, C.D. Fátima in the same tier, having to resume his career in the lower leagues of the country.

On 29 March 2017, nearly one year after leaving his last club, Sport Benfica e Castelo Branco, Bijou announced his retirement at the age of 30.

References

External links

1986 births
Living people
Sportspeople from Praia
Cape Verdean footballers
Association football midfielders
Sporting Clube da Praia players
Liga Portugal 2 players
Segunda Divisão players
S.L. Benfica B players
Gondomar S.C. players
C.D. Fátima players
C.D. Pinhalnovense players
AD Fafe players
F.C. Arouca players
Atlético Clube de Portugal players
Varzim S.C. players
Sport Benfica e Castelo Branco players
Cape Verdean expatriate footballers
Expatriate footballers in Portugal
Cape Verdean expatriate sportspeople in Portugal